Tinglerz are a chocolate-covered candy made by The Willy Wonka Candy Company. On the inside is a Pop-Rocks-like candy. They were unveiled at the All Candy Expo in 2008.

References
 
 Wonka.com

External links
 Tinglerzl 

The Willy Wonka Candy Company brands
Candy